This is a list of excipients per vaccine, as published by the United States Centers for Disease Control. Vaccine ingredients and production in other nations are substantially the same. Also listed are substances used in the manufacturing process.

See also
 Excipient
 Vaccine types
 Vaccination schedule
 Adjuvant
 Preservative
 Cell culture
 Growth medium

References
The initial list is based on information from the Centers for Disease Control and Prevention (CDC) and the Food and Drug Administration (FDA) and thus limited to US-approved vaccines.

Excipients
Excipients